The yoma danio (Danio feegradei) is a fish in the family Cyprinidae, a species of danio from Myanmar. It can grow up to 8 cm in length.

Although discovered by Hora in 1937, it was first exported in 2005.

These fish has an exceptional ability for jumping. It can jump vertically to a height of over a foot (0.3 m) and may jump in this manner repeatedly.

The Yoma danio is quite variable in appearance, with some specimens developing black bars.

References

External links
Danio feegradei

Danio
Fish described in 1937
Fish of Myanmar
Cyprinid fish of Asia